Darevskia defilippii, also known commonly as the Alborz lizard or the Elburs lizard,  is a species of lizard in the family Lacertidae. The species is endemic to Iran.

Etymology
The specific name, defilippii, is in honor of Italian zoologist Filippo de Filippi.

Geographic range
D. defilippii is found in the Alborz Mountains of northern Iran.

Habitat
D. defilippii typically occurs on rocky slopes with shrubby vegetation, but it has also been recorded in grassy alpine landscapes and close to the upper limits of Hyrcanian forest.

Reproduction
D. defilippii is oviparous.

Gallery

References

Further reading
Camerano L (1877). "Considerazioni sul genere Lacerta Linn. e descrizione di due nuove specie ". Atti della Reale Accademia delle Scienze di Torino 13: 79–98. (Podarcis defilippii, new species, pp. 90–92). (in Italian).

Darevskia
Reptiles of Iran
Endemic fauna of Iran
Reptiles described in 1877
Taxa named by Lorenzo Camerano